José Gilberto García Ruminot (born 22 May 1955) is a Chilean politician and accountant who has served as member of the Senate of Chile.

References

External links
 
 BCN Profile

1955 births
Living people
Pontifical Catholic University of Chile alumni
University of La Frontera alumni
20th-century Chilean politicians
21st-century Chilean politicians
National Renewal (Chile) politicians
Senators of the LV Legislative Period of the National Congress of Chile
Senators of the LVI Legislative Period of the National Congress of Chile